Nordland may refer to:

Places
Nordland, a county in Norway
Nordlandet, an island in Kristiansund, Norway
Nordland, Nordland, a village in the island municipality of Værøy in Nordland county, Norway
Nordland, Washington, a community in the United States
Nordland Township (disambiguation), the name of several townships in the United States
Northern Norway, a geographical region in Norway

Fiction
Nordland (Warhammer), a province in the land of "The Empire" in the Warhammer Fantasy setting
The land occupied by the Norts in the Rogue Trooper fictional scenario

Music
Nordland (band), a 1980s Danish pop band
Nordland I and Nordland II, albums by the Swedish Viking metal band Bathory

Ships
, a German gunnery training ship from 1944 to 1945, formerly the Danish coastal defence ship HDMS Niels Juel
 a German fishing trawler in service 1922–39, and 1939–40
V 401 Nordland a Vorpostenboot in service in 1939
V 411 Nordland a Vorpostenboot in service in 1939
, a Royal Navy salvage boat in service 1940–48

Other
Nordland (boat), a type of fishing boat used in northern Norway
Nordland (magazine), a Nazi publication in Sweden
SS Division Nordland, a Waffen-SS unit
Nordland Line, a railway line in Northern Norway

See also
Norrland